Ulting is a small village and civil parish in the Maldon district, in the county of Essex, England. It shares its borders with Langford and Nounsley. It the location of Ulting Wick garden.

History
Ulting was the location of the first sugar beet factory in England, although its useful life was cut short by cheap imports of cane sugar.

Ernest Doe & Sons produced farm machinery in the 1950s and 1960s, including the odd Doe Triple-D tractor.

Church
All Saints, the village church, has been standing since 1150, with a major restoration taking place in the 1870s. The church was once a place of pilgrimage ranking with Walsingham and other famous shrines. The River Chelmer runs next to the church and through Ulting.

Notable residents
The photographer and designer Humphrey Spender, a brother of the poet Stephen Spender, lived in Ulting for many years before his death in 2005.

References

External links
 Ulting walk and history

Villages in Essex
Civil parishes in Essex
Maldon District